The Yellow Cab Manufacturing Company was established in 1920 by John D. Hertz and was associated with the Yellow Cab Company which Hertz also owned.

History

The Yellow Cab Manufacturing Company was established in 1920 by John D. Hertz and was associated with the Yellow Cab Company which Hertz also owned.

From 1921 the company manufactured Passenger Cars and Light Trucks and by 1923 its earning were $4,005,365. Hertz established the  Yellow Coach Manufacturing Company as subsidiary of the Yellow Cab Company in that year.

The company was sold to General Motors in 1925.

References

Yellow Cab Company
Defunct manufacturing companies based in Chicago
Motor vehicle manufacturers based in Illinois
Vehicle manufacturing companies established in 1920 
American companies established in 1920
1920 establishments in Illinois
Vehicle manufacturing companies disestablished in 1925
1925 disestablishments in Illinois